Gary is a city in Lake County, Indiana, United States. The city has been historically dominated by major industrial activity and is home to U.S. Steel's Gary Works, the largest steel mill complex in North America. The city is adjacent to the Indiana Dunes National Park, and is within the Chicago metropolitan area.

Gary was named after lawyer Elbert Henry Gary, who was the founding chairman of the United States Steel Corporation. U.S. Steel had established the city as a company town to serve its steel mills. Although initially a very diverse city, after white flight in the 1970s, the city of Gary held the nation's highest percentage of African Americans for several decades. 

As of the 2020 census the city's population was 70,093, making it Indiana's ninth-largest city. Like other Rust Belt cities, Gary's once thriving steel industry has been significantly affected by the disappearance of local manufacturing jobs since the 1970s. As a result of this economic shift, the city's population has decreased drastically, having lost 61% of its population since 1960. Because of its large losses in population and deteriorating economy, Gary is often cited as an example of industrial decline and urban decay in America. 

Gary is serviced by the Gary/Chicago International Airport, an alternative airport to the Chicago region's two larger airports. The city's public transport is provided by the Gary Public Transportation Corporation and the South Shore Line passenger railway, which connects to the Chicago transit system. It is also home to a professional baseball team, the Gary SouthShore RailCats. In addition to its large steel mills, the city is known for being the birthplace of the Jackson family, a family of well-known entertainers whose members include singer Michael Jackson.

History

Founding and early years

Gary, Indiana, was founded in 1906 by the United States Steel Corporation as the home for its new plant, Gary Works. The city was named after lawyer Elbert Henry Gary, who was the founding chairman of the United States Steel Corporation.

Gary was the site of civil unrest in the steel strike of 1919. On October 4, 1919, a riot broke out on Broadway, the main north-south street through downtown Gary, between steel workers and strike breakers brought in from outside. Three days later, Indiana governor James P. Goodrich declared martial law. Shortly thereafter, over 4,000 federal troops under the command of Major General Leonard Wood arrived to restore order.

The jobs offered by the steel industry provided Gary with very rapid growth and a diverse population within the first 26 years of its founding. According to the 1920 United States Census, 29.7% of Gary's population at the time was classified as foreign-born, mostly from eastern European countries, with another 30.8% classified as native-born with at least one foreign-born parent. By the 1930 United States Census, the first census in which Gary's population exceeded 100,000, the city was the fifth largest in Indiana and comparable in size to South Bend, Fort Wayne, and Evansville. At that time, 78.7% of the population was classified as white, with 19.3% of the population classified as foreign-born and another 25.9% as native-born with at least one foreign-born parent. In addition to white internal migrants, Gary had attracted numerous African-American migrants from the South in the Great Migration, and 17.8% of the population was classified as black. 3.5% were classified as Mexican (now likely to be identified as Hispanic, as some were likely American citizens in addition to immigrants).

Post-World War II

Gary's fortunes have risen and fallen with those of the steel industry. The growth of the steel industry brought prosperity to the community. Broadway was known as a commercial center for the region. Department stores and architecturally significant movie houses were built in the downtown area and the Glen Park neighborhood.

In the 1960s, like many other American urban centers reliant on one particular industry, Gary entered a spiral of decline. Gary's decline was brought on by the growing overseas competitiveness in the steel industry, which had caused U.S. Steel to lay off many workers from the Gary area. The U.S. Steel Gary Works employed over 30,000 in 1970, declined to just 6,000 by 1990, and further declined to 5,100 in August 2015. Attempts to shore up the city's economy with major construction projects, such as a Holiday Inn hotel and the Genesis Convention Center, failed to reverse the decline.

A rapid racial change occurred in Gary during the late 20th century. These population changes resulted in political change which reflected the racial demographics of Gary: the non-white share of the city's population increased from 21% in 1930, 39% in 1960, to 53% in 1970. Non-whites were primarily restricted to living in the Midtown section just south of downtown (per the 1950 Census, 97% of the black population of Gary was living in this neighborhood). Gary had one of the nation's first African-American mayors, Richard G. Hatcher, and hosted the groundbreaking 1972 National Black Political Convention.

In the late 1990s and early 2000s, Gary had the highest percentage of African-Americans of U.S. cities with a population of 100,000 or more, 84% (as of the 2000 U.S. census). This no longer applies to Gary since the population of the city has now fallen well below 100,000 residents. As of 2013, the Gary Department of Redevelopment has estimated that one-third of all homes in the city are unoccupied and/or abandoned.

U.S. Steel continues to be a major steel producer, but with only a fraction of its former level of employment. While Gary has failed to reestablish a manufacturing base since its population peak, two casinos opened along the Gary lakeshore in the 1990s, although this has been aggravated by the state closing of Cline Avenue, an important access to the area. Today, Gary faces the difficulties of a Rust Belt city, including unemployment and decaying infrastructure.

Recent history
Gary has closed several of its schools within the last ten years. While some of the school buildings have been reused, most remain unused since their closing. As of 2014, Gary is considering closing additional schools in response to budget deficits.

Gary chief of police Thomas Houston was convicted of excessive force and abuse of authority in 2008; he died in 2010 while serving a three-year, five-month federal prison sentence.

In April 2011, 75-year-old mayor Rudolph M. Clay announced that he would suspend his campaign for reelection as he was being treated for prostate cancer. He endorsed rival Karen Freeman-Wilson, who won the Democratic mayoral primary in May 2011. Freeman-Wilson won election with 87 percent of the vote and her term began in January 2012; she is the first woman elected mayor in the city's history. She was reelected in 2015. She was defeated in her bid for a third term in the 2019 Democratic primary by Lake County Assessor Jerome Prince. Since no challengers filed for the November 2019 general election, Prince's nomination is effectively tantamount to election, and officially succeeded Freeman-Wilson on January 1, 2020, two days after he was sworn in as the city's 21st mayor on December 30, 2019.

In May 2021, a $300 million Hard Rock Casino location opened in the city. Branded as Hard Rock Casino Northern Indiana, the location includes memorabilia from local natives Jackson 5 and a 1,950-seat Hard Rock Live performance hall.

National Register of Historic Places
The following single properties and national historic districts are listed on the National Register of Historic Places:

 American Sheet and Tin Mill Apartment Building
 Louis J. Bailey Branch Library-Gary International Institute
 Combs Addition Historic District
 Ralph Waldo Emerson School
 Eskilson Historic District
 Gary Bathing Beach Aquatorium
 Gary City Center Historic District
 Gary Land Company Building
 Gary Public Schools Memorial Auditorium
 Jackson-Monroe Terraces Historic District
 Jefferson Street Historic District
 Knights of Columbus Building
 Lincoln Street Historic District
 Horace Mann Historic District
 Miller Town Hall
 Monroe Terrace Historic District
 Morningside Historic District
 Polk Street Concrete Cottage Historic District
 Polk Street Terraces Historic District
 Theodore Roosevelt High School
 Barney Sablotney House
 St. Augustine's Episcopal Church
 Van Buren Terrace Historic District
 West Fifth Avenue Apartments Historic District
 St. John's Evangelical Lutheran Church and School

Neighborhoods

Downtown Gary 
Downtown Gary is separated by Broadway into two distinctive communities. Originally, the City of Gary consisted of The East Side, The West Side, The South Side (the area south of the train tracks near 9th Avenue), and Glen Park, located further South along Broadway. The East Side was demarcated by streets named after the States in order of their acceptance into the Union. This area contained mostly wood-frame houses, some of the earliest in the city, and became known in the 20th century for its ethnic populations from Europe and large families. The single-family houses had repeating house designs that alternated from one street to another, with some streets looking very similar. Among the East Side's most notable buildings were Memorial Auditorium (a large red-brick and stone civic auditorium and the site of numerous events, concerts and graduations), The Palace Theater, Emerson School, St. Luke's Church, H.C. Gordon & Sons, and Goldblatt's Department stores, in addition to the Fair Department Store. All fronted Broadway as the main street that divided Gary.

The West Side of Gary, or West of Broadway, the principal commercial street, had streets named after the presidents of the United States in order of their election. Lytton's, Hudson's ladies store, J.C. Penney, and Radigan Bros Furniture Store developed on the west side of Broadway. Developed later, this side of town was known for its masonry or brick residences, its taller and larger commercial buildings, including the Gary National Bank Building, Hotel Gary (now Genesis Towers), The Knights of Columbus Hotel & Building (now a seniors building fronting 5th Avenue), the Tivoli Theater (demolished), the U.S. Post Office, Main Library, Mercy and Methodist Hospitals and Holy Angels Cathedral and School. The West Side also had a secondary principal street, Fifth Avenue, which was lined with many commercial businesses, restaurants, theaters, tall buildings, and elegant apartment buildings. The West Side was viewed as having wealthier residents. The houses dated from about 1908 to the 1930s. Much of the West Side's housing were for executives of U.S. Steel and other prominent businessmen. Notable mansions were 413 Tyler Street and 636 Lincoln Street. Many of the houses were on larger lots. By contrast, a working-class area was made up of row houses made of poured concrete were arranged together and known as "Mill Houses"; they were built to house steel mill workers.

The areas known as Emerson and Downtown West combine to form Downtown Gary. It was developed in the 1920s and houses several pieces of impressive architecture, including the Moe House, designed by Frank Lloyd Wright, and another, the Wynant House (1917), which was destroyed by fire. A significant number of older structures have been demolished in recent years because of the cost of restoration. Restructuring of the steel and other heavy industry in the late 20th century resulted in a loss of jobs, adversely affecting the city.

Abandoned buildings in the downtown area include historic structures such as Union Station, the Palace Theater, and City Methodist Church. A large area of the downtown neighborhood (including City Methodist) was devastated by a major fire on October 12, 1997. Interstate 90 was constructed between downtown Gary and the United States Steel plant.

West

Ambridge Mann is a neighborhood located on Gary's near west side along 5th Avenue. Ambridge was developed for workers at the nearby steel plant in the 1910s and 1920s. It is named after the American Bridge Works, which was a subsidiary of U.S. Steel. The neighborhood is home to a huge stock of prairie-style and art deco homes. The Gary Masonic Temple was located in the neighborhood, along with the Ambassador apartment building. Located just south of Interstate 90, the neighborhood can be seen while passing Buchanan Street.

Brunswick is located on Gary's far west side. The neighborhood is located just south of Interstate 90 and can also be seen from the expressway. The Brunswick area includes the Tri-City Plaza shopping center on West 5th Avenue (U.S. 20). The area is south of the Gary Chicago International Airport.

Downtown West is located in north-central Gary on the west side of Broadway just south of Interstate 90. The Genesis Convention Center, the Gary Police Department, the Lake Superior Court House, and the Main Branch of the Gary Public Library are located along 5th Avenue. A new 123-unit mixed-income apartment development was built using a HUD HOPE VI grant in 2006. The Adam Benjamin Metro Center is located just north of 4th Avenue. It is operated by the Gary Public Transportation Corporation and serves as a multi-modal hub. It serves both as the Downtown Gary South Shore train station and an intercity bus stop.

Tolleston is one of Gary's oldest neighborhoods, predating much of the rest of the city. It was platted by George Tolle in 1857 when the railroads were constructed in this area. This area is west of Midtown and south of Ambridge Mann. Tarrytown is a subdivision located in Tolleston between Whitcomb Street and Clark Road.

South

Black Oak is located on the far southwest side of Gary, in the vicinity of the Burr Street exit to the Borman Expressway. It was annexed in the 1970s. Prior to that, Black Oak was an unincorporated area informally associated with Hammond, and the area has Hammond telephone numbers. After three referendums, the community voters approved annexation, having been persuaded by Mayor Hatcher that they would benefit more from services provided by the city than from those provided by the county. In the 21st century, it is the only majority-white neighborhood in Gary.

Glen Park is located on Gary's far south side and is made up mostly of mid-twentieth-century houses. Glen Park is divided from the remainder of the city by the Borman Expressway. The northern portion of Glen Park is home to Gary's Gleason Park Golf Course and the campus of Indiana University Northwest. The far western portion of Glen Park is home to the Village Shopping Center. Glen Park includes the 37th Avenue corridor at Broadway.

Midtown is located south of Downtown Gary, along Broadway. In the pre-1960s days of de facto segregation, this developed historically as a "black" neighborhood as African Americans came to Gary from the rural South in the Great Migration to seek jobs in the industrial economy.

North and East

Aetna is located on Gary's far east side along the Dunes Highway. Aetna predates the city of Gary. This company town was founded in 1881 by the Aetna Powder Works, an explosives company. Their factory closed after the end of World War I.

The Town of Aetna was annexed by Gary in 1928, around the same time that the city annexed the Town of Miller. In the late 1920s and early 1930s, Gary's prosperous industries helped generate residential and other development in Aetna, resulting in an impressive collection of art deco architecture. The rest of the community was built after World War II and the Korean War in the 1950s, in a series of phases. On its south and east, Aetna borders the undeveloped floodplain of the Little Calumet River.

Emerson is located in north-central Gary on the east side of Broadway. Located just south of Interstate 90, Gary City Hall is located in Emerson, along with the Indiana Department of Social Services building and the Calumet Township Trustee's office. A 6,000-seat minor league baseball stadium for the Gary SouthShore RailCats, U.S. Steel Yard, was constructed in 2002, along with contiguous commercial space and minor residential development.

Miller Beach, also known simply as Miller, is on Gary's far northeast side. Settled in the 1850s and incorporated as an independent town in 1907, Miller was annexed by the city of Gary in 1918. Miller developed around the old stagecoach stop and train station known by the 1850s as Miller's Junction and/or Miller's Station. Miller Beach is racially and economically diverse. It attracts investor interest due to the many year-round and summer homes within walking distance of Marquette Park and Lake Michigan. Prices for lakefront property are affordable compared to those in Illinois suburban communities. Lake Street provides shopping and dining options for Miller Beach visitors and residents. East Edge, a development of 28 upscale condominium, townhome, and single-family homes, began construction in 2007 at the eastern edge of Miller Beach along County Line Road, one block south of Lake Michigan.

Geography

The city is located at the southern end of the former lake bed of the prehistoric Lake Chicago and the current Lake Michigan. Most of the city's soil, to nearly one foot below the surface, is pure sand. The sand beneath Gary, and on its beaches, is of such volume and quality that for over a century companies have mined it, especially for the manufacture of glass.

Gary is "T" shaped, with its northern border on Lake Michigan. In the northwesternmost section, Gary borders Hammond and East Chicago; 165th Street, one of several roads connecting Hammond and Gary, has been walled off from Gary since 1981, initially due to a toxic flood. Miller Beach, Gary's easternmost neighborhood, borders Lake Station and Portage. Gary's southernmost section borders Griffith, Hobart, Merrillville, and unincorporated Ross.

Climate
Gary is listed by the Köppen-Geiger climate classification system as humid continental (Dfa). In July and August, the warmest months, high temperatures average 84 °F (29 °C) and peak just above 100 °F (38 °C), and low temperatures average 63 °F (17 °C). In January and February, the coldest months, high temperatures average around 29 °F (−2 °C) and low temperatures average 13 °F (−11 °C), with at least a few days of temperatures dipping below 0 °F (−18 °C).

The weather in Gary is greatly regulated by its proximity to Lake Michigan. Weather varies yearly. In the summer months Gary is humid. The city's yearly precipitation averages about 40 inches. Summer is the rainiest season. Winters vary but are predominantly snowy. Snowfall in Gary averages approximately 25 inches per year. Sometimes large blizzards hit because of "lake effect snow", a phenomenon whereby large amounts of water evaporated from the lake deposit onto the shoreline areas as inordinate amounts of snow.

Demographics
The change in the economy and resulting loss of jobs has caused a drop in population by more than half since its peak in 1960.

2020 census

Note: the US Census treats Hispanic/Latino as an ethnic category. This table excludes Latinos from the racial categories and assigns them to a separate category. Hispanics/Latinos can be of any race.

2010 census
As of the census of 2010, there were 80,294 people, 31,380 households, and 19,691 families residing in the city. The racial makeup of the city was 84.8% African American, 10.7% White, 0.3% Native American, 0.2% Asian, 1.8% from other races, and 2.1% from two or more races. Hispanic or Latino people of any race were 5.1% of the population. Non-Hispanic Whites were 8.9% of the population in 2010, down from 39.1% in 1970.

There were 31,380 households, of which 33.5% had children under the age of 18 living with them, 25.2% were married couples living together, 30.9% had a female householder with no husband present, 6.7% had a male householder with no wife present, and 37.2% were non-families. 32.8% of all households were made up of individuals, and 11.9% had someone living alone who was 65 years of age or older. The average household size was 2.54 and the average family size was 3.23.

The median age in the city was 36.7 years. 28.1% of residents were under the age of 18; 8.6% were between the ages of 18 and 24; 21.8% were from 25 to 44; 27.1% were from 45 to 64; and 14.5% were 65 years of age or older. The gender makeup of the city was 46.0% male and 54.0% female.

2000 census
As of the census of 2000, there were 102,746 people, 38,244 households, and 25,623 families residing in the city. The racial makeup of the city was 84.03% African American, 11.92% White, 0.21% Native American, 0.14% Asian, 0.02% Pacific Islander, 1.97% from other races, and 1.71% from two or more races. Hispanic or Latino people of any race were 4.93% of the population.

There were 38,244 households, out of which 31.2% had children under the age of 18 living with them, 30.2% were married couples living together, 30.9% had a female householder with no husband present, and 33.0% were non-families. 28.9% of all households were made up of individuals, and 9.4% had someone living alone who was 65 years of age or older. The average household size was 2.66 and the average family size was 3.28.

In the city, the population was spread out, with 29.9% under the age of 18, 10.1% from 18 to 24, 25.1% from 25 to 44, 22.2% from 45 to 64, and 12.8% who were 65 years of age or older. The median age was 34 years. For every 100 females, there were 84.6 males. For every 100 females age 18 and over, there were 78.0 males.

The median income for a household in the city was $27,195, and the median income for a family was $32,205. Males had a median income of $34,992 versus $24,432 for females. The per capita income for the city was $14,383. About 22.2% of families and 25.8% of the population were below the poverty line, including 37.9% of those under age 18 and 14.1% of those age 65 or over.

Arts and culture

Arts and film

Meredith Willson's 1957 Broadway musical The Music Man featured the song "Gary, Indiana", in which lead character (and con man) Professor Harold Hill wistfully recalls his purported hometown, then prosperous.  Hill claims to be an alumnus of "Gary Conservatory of Music, Class of '05," but this is later revealed to be another of his lies. The City of Gary was not founded until 1906. Willson's musical, set in 1912, was adapted both as a film of the same name released in 1962, and as a television film, produced in 2003.

The 1996 urban film Original Gangstas was filmed in the city. It starred Gary native Fred Williamson, Pam Grier, Jim Brown, Richard Roundtree, and Isabel Sanford, among others. Since the early 2000s, Gary has been the setting for numerous films made by Hollywood filmmakers. In 2009, scenes for the remake of A Nightmare on Elm Street were filmed in Gary. Scenes from Transformers: Dark of the Moon wrapped up filming on August 16, 2010.

The History Channel documentary Life After People was filmed in Gary, exploring areas that have deteriorated or been abandoned because of the loss of jobs and residents.

In John Mellencamp's 1985 song, "Minutes to Memories", an old man on a bus, recalling his humble life, tells the young man beside him, "I worked my whole life in the steel mills of Gary."

Historic places on the National Register

Public libraries

The Gary Public Library System consists of the main library at 220 West 5th Avenue and several branches: Brunswick Branch, W. E. B. DuBois Branch, J. F. Kennedy Branch, Tolleston Branch, and Woodson Branch. In March 2011, the Gary Library Board voted to close the main library on 5th Avenue and the Tolleston branch in what officials said was their best economic option. The main library closed at the end of 2011. The building now houses a museum.

Lake County Public Library operates the Black Oak Branch at 5921 West 25th Avenue in the Gary city limits. In addition, Indiana University Northwest operates the John W. Anderson Library on its campus.

Sports

The following sports franchises are based in Gary:

The Gary SouthShore RailCats are an American Association, professional baseball team. The team plays in Gary's U.S. Steel Yard baseball stadium. The RailCats played in the Northern League from 2002 until 2010. They now play in the modern American Association. The team won league championships in 2005, 2007, and 2013.
Gary has hosted two professional basketball franchises. The Gary Splash played in the International Basketball League from 2010 to 2013, at the Genesis Convention Center. Previously, the Gary Steelheads played in the Genesis Convention Center as part of the IBL (1999–2001), CBA, USBL, and IBL.

Education
Three school districts serve the city, and multiple charter schools are located within the city.

Public schools
Most public schools in Gary are administered by the Gary Community School Corporation. The other public schools within the city are administered by Lake Ridge Schools Corporation, which is the school system for the Black Oak neighborhood and unincorporated Calumet Township. Due to annexation law, Black Oak residents retained their original school system and were not required to attend Gary public schools. In 1927, it was mandated that Black students attend a separate high school.

Charter schools
Charter schools in Indiana, including those in Gary, are granted charters by one of a small number of chartering institutions. Indiana charter schools are generally managed in cooperation between the chartering institution, a local board of parents and community members, salaried school administrators, and a management company. Charter schools in Gary as of 2011 include Thea Bowman Leadership Academy, Charter School of the Dunes, Gary Lighthouse Charter School (formerly Blessed Sacrament Parish and Grade School), and 21st Century Charter.

Higher education

Gary is home to two regional state college campuses:
Indiana University Northwest
Ivy Tech Community College Northwest

Media

Newspapers
Gary is served by two major newspapers based outside the city, and by a Gary-based, largely African-American interest paper. These papers provide regional topics, and cover events in Gary.
The Post-Tribune, originally the Gary Post-Tribune, is now based in the nearby town of  Merrillville.
The Times, previously known as the Hammond Times. Offices and facilities for The Times are in nearby Munster.
The Gary Crusader, based in Gary and largely focused on African-American interests and readership
The INFO Newspaper, based in Gary and largely focused on African-American interests and readership
The Chicago Tribune and the Chicago Sun-Times, based in Chicago, are also distributed in Gary.

Television and radio
Gary is served by five local broadcasters plus government access and numerous Chicago area radio and TV stations, and by other nearby stations in Illinois and Indiana.
WPWR-TV (Channel 50) is the Chicago MyNetworkTV affiliate but is licensed to Gary. Studios and transmitters are co-located with WFLD's in Chicago, and are also owned by Fox Television Stations.
WYIN (Channel 56) is a PBS affiliate licensed to Gary. Their studios are in Merrillville.
WGVE (FM 88.7) is owned by the Gary Community School Corporation, and is used primarily as a teaching facility. Programming is maintained by students in the broadcast program at the Gary Career Center. WGVE also carries limited NPR programming.
WLTH (AM 1370) primarily carries talk programming, as well as other local programs.
WWCA (AM 1270) is a Relevant Radio owned-and-operated radio station, carrying programming from the Catholic-oriented Relevant Radio network.

Infrastructure

Medical facilities
Gary Community Health Center
Methodist Hospital

Police
Gary is served by the Gary Police Department and the Lake County Sheriff. While 1 in 270 people are victimized by a violent crime in Indiana, that rate is 1 in 177 in Gary.

Fire department

The Gary Fire Department (GFD) provides fire protection and emergency medical services to the city of Gary.

Transportation

Gary Public Transportation Corporation (GPTC) is a commuter bus system that offers service to numerous stops throughout the city and neighboring suburbs. GPTC also has express service to locations outside the city, including connections to Chicago transit. Front-door pickup is available for disabled citizens at no extra cost.
Gary/Chicago International Airport is operating as the "third airport" for the Chicago area. With a new runway, it previously underwent a federally funded expansion, and the administration has been courting airlines aggressively. The National Guard has based its Chicago area air operation there as well.
Interstate 90 (I-90, Indiana Toll Road), I-80, I-94, and I-65 run through Gary, as well as U.S. Highway 6 (US 6), US 12 and US 20, and State Road 912 (SR 912, Cline Avenue). A former stretch of SR 312 has been decommissioned.
Northern Indiana Commuter Transportation District (NICTD) operates the South Shore Line, a commuter rail system between Chicago and South Bend. It is one of the last original operating interurban railway systems in the US.

Notable people

The Jacksons

Gary is the hometown of the Jackson family, a family of musicians who influenced the sound of modern popular music. In 1950, Joseph and Katherine Jackson moved from East Chicago, Indiana into their two-bedroom house at 2300 Jackson Street. They had married on November 5, 1949. Their entertainer children later recorded a song entitled "2300 Jackson Street" (1989). The Jackson children include:

Rebbie Jackson 
Jackie Jackson 
Tito Jackson 
Jermaine Jackson 
La Toya Jackson 
Marlon Jackson
Michael Jackson 
Randy Jackson 
Janet Jackson

Other notable people

Charles Adkins, Olympic boxer
Forddy Anderson, NCAA basketball coach
Dan Barreiro, sports radio talk show host
Bob Benoit, horse racing executive
Albert M. Bielawski, early 20th century Michigan politician
Frank Borman, crew member of Apollo 8, the first crew to fly to and orbit the Moon; oldest living former astronaut 
Lyman Bostock, Major League Baseball (MLB) player 
John Brim, bluesman
Donna Britt, journalist and author
Avery Brooks, actor, director 
Vic Bubas, NCAA basketball coach 
John A. Bushemi, WWII photographer killed in action 
Vivian Carter, music producer
John Chickerneo, National Football League (NFL) player
Rudolph M. Clay, Mayor of Gary 2006–12
William Coyne, DuPont Company executive
Branden Dawson (born 1993), basketball player
Tony DeSantis (1914–2007), founder of Drury Lane theaters
Polly Draper (born 1955), actress, Thirtysomething
Dianne Durham (1967-2021), first Black national gymnastics champion
Clarissa Pinkola Estés, writer and psychoanalyst
Bianca Ferguson (born 1955), actress, General Hospital
Harry Flournoy (1943–2016), basketball player
Tellis Frank (born 1965), basketball player
Karen Freeman-Wilson (born 1960), Mayor of Gary 2012–19, former Indiana Attorney General
Maurice Friedman (1903–1991), reproductive-physiology researcher
Winston Garland (born 1964), basketball player
Joe Gates (1954–2010), baseball player
Freddie Gibbs (born 1982), rapper
A. J. Hammons (born 1992), basketball player
Tom Harmon (1919–1990), 1940 Heisman Trophy winner for Michigan, sportscaster, father of actor Mark Harmon
Richard G. Hatcher (1933–2019), Mayor of Gary 1968–87
LaTroy Hawkins (born 1972), MLB pitcher for 21 years
Chuck Higgins, saxophonist, best known for the song "Pachuko Hop" 
Eric Hillman (born 1966), MLB and Japan pitcher
Gerald Irons (born 1949), NFL linebacker for Oakland Raiders and Cleveland Browns 1970–79
Johnny Jackson (1955–2006), drummer for Jackson 5; murdered in Gary in 2006
Tim Jankovich, basketball head coach, SMU
Elijah Johnson (born 1990), basketball player in the Israeli Basketball Premier League
Jason Johnson (born 1965), NFL player
Tank Johnson (born 1981), NFL player
Alex Karras (1935–2012), winner of Outland Trophy, member of College Football Hall of Fame and Pro Football Hall of Fame, NFL player and actor (Blazing Saddles, Webster)
Lou Karras (1927–2018), NFL player 1950–52
Ted Karras Jr. (born 1964), football player and coach
Ted Karras Sr. (1934–2016), NFL player 1958–66
Robert Kearns (1927–2005), inventor of intermittent windshield wiper systems, subject of Flash of Genius
Big Daddy Kinsey (1927-2002) Blues singer, guitarist, harmonica player and bandleader of The Kinsey Report with his sons 
Ron Kittle (born 1958), Chicago White Sox outfielder and 1983 American League Rookie of the Year
Milo Komenich (1920–1977), basketball player for 1943 national champion Wyoming
Bob Kuechenberg (1947–2019), NFL lineman, two-time Super Bowl champion with Miami Dolphins
Barney Liddell (1921–2003), trombonist in the Lawrence Welk Orchestra, 1948–1982
 Kevin Magee (1959–2003), basketball player
Karl Malden (1912–2009), Academy Award-winning actor; born in Chicago, raised in Gary
William Marshall (1924–2003), stage and film actor
Milt May (born 1950), professional baseball player
Kym Mazelle (born 1960), singer
Willie McCarter (born 1946), NBA player, Los Angeles Lakers
Lloyd McClendon (born 1959), professional baseball player, manager of Pittsburgh Pirates, Seattle Mariners
Matt McConnell (born 1963), television broadcaster for the Arizona Coyotes, National Hockey League
James McCracken, opera singer
Robert A. McDonald (born 1953), CEO of Procter & Gamble, Secretary of Veterans Affairs under Barack Obama
Ralph McQuarrie (1929–2012), conceptual designer and illustrator for Star Wars
Larry Moffett (1954–2011), basketball player
Brandon Moore (born 1980), NFL player
Sista Monica Parker (1956–2014), electric blues, gospel and soul singer, songwriter, producer
Jerilynn Patton, known as Jlin, electronic musician
Jon Petrovich (1947–2011), television executive, CNN
Dan Plesac (born 1962), MLB pitcher with 18-year career, MLB Network analyst
Jesse Powell (born 1971-2022), recording artist
Elizabeth Brown Pryor (1951–2015), author and diplomat
Jimmy Reed (1925–1976), musician, Blues Hall of Fame
Glenn Robinson (born 1973), NBA player and league's No. 1 draft pick, father of Glenn Robinson III
Glenn Robinson III (born 1994), NBA player
Paul Samuelson (1915–2009), economist, recipient of John Bates Clark Medal (1947) and Nobel Prize (1970)
Sharmell (born 1970), WWE wrestler and valet
Jerry Shay (born 1944), NFL player 1966–71
Helene Stanley (1929–1990), film actress
Joseph Stiglitz (born 1943), economist, recipient of John Bates Clark Medal (1979) and Nobel Prize (2001)
Hank Stram (1923–2005), NFL head coach 1960–1977, member of Pro Football Hall of Fame
Jeanne Stunyo (born 1936), diver, Olympic silver medalist
George Taliaferro (1927–2018), quarterback in College Football Hall of Fame
Crystal Taliefero (born 1963), singer
Ernest Lee Thomas (born 1949), actor (What's Happening!!)
Todd Wagner (born 1960), entrepreneur
Deniece Williams (born 1950), Grammy Award-winning R&B artist
Fred Williamson (born 1938), NFL player, linebacker for Kansas City Chiefs in Super Bowl I, 3-time AFL All-Star, actor, director, producer
Tony Zale (1913–1997), twice middleweight champion, member of International Boxing Hall of Fame

Sister cities
 Fuxin, Liaoning, China
 Lagos, Nigeria

See also

Northwest Indiana
Neighborhoods in Gary, Indiana
:Magnitogorsk, a city in Russia modeled after Gary

References

Further reading
 Barnes, Sandra L. The cost of being poor: A comparative study of life in poor urban neighborhoods in Gary, Indiana (State University of New York Press, 2012).
 Betten, Neil, and Raymond A. Mohl. "From discrimination to repatriation: Mexican Life in Gary, Indiana, during the great depression." Pacific Historical Review 42.3 (1973): 370-388. online
 Brook, Anthony. "Gary, Indiana: steeltown extraordinary." Journal of American Studies 9.1 (1975): 35-53.
 Catlin, Robert A. Racial politics and urban planning: Gary, Indiana, 1980-1989 (University Press of Kentucky, 1993).
 Cohen, Ronald D. Children of the mill: Schooling and society in Gary, Indiana, 1906-1960 (Routledge, 2014).

 Hurly, Andrew. "The social biases of environmental change in Gary, Indiana, 1945–1980." Environmental Review 12.4 (1988): 1-20.
 Hurley, Andrew. Environmental inequalities: Class, race, and industrial pollution in Gary, Indiana, 1945-1980 (Univ of North Carolina Press, 1995).

 
 
 

 Mohl, Raymond A., and Neil Betten. "The failure of industrial city planning: Gary, Indiana, 1906–1910." Journal of the American Institute of Planners 38.4 (1972): 203-214.
 
 O'Hara, S. Paul. " 'The Very Model of Modern Urban Decay': Outsiders’ Narratives of Industry and Urban Decline in Gary, Indiana." Journal of Urban History 37.2 (2011): 135-154.

External links

 
Chicago metropolitan area
Cities in Indiana
Company towns in Indiana
Northwest Indiana
Populated places established in 1906
Cities in Lake County, Indiana
Indiana populated places on Lake Michigan
Inland port cities and towns in Indiana
Urban decay in the United States
U.S. Steel
1906 establishments in Indiana